Aarestrup (â´re-ströp) is a Danish surname
. Notable people with the surname include:

Emil Aarestrup (1800–1856), Danish physician and poet
Gustav Aarestrup (1916–2005), Norwegian jurist and businessperson
Marie Aarestrup (1826–1919), Norwegian genre, portrait and animal painter
Nicolay Aarestrup (1898–1983), Norwegian businessperson

References

Danish-language surnames